John Thomas Cheeseman (August 3, 1892 – February 22, 1968) was a businessman and politician in Newfoundland. He represented Burin from 1919 to 1923, Burgeo-LaPoile from 1956 to 1962 and Hermitage from 1962 to 1966.

The son of Lawrence Cheeseman, he was born in Port au Bras and was educated there and at Bishop Feild College. Cheeseman worked for a time in his father's fishery business, then became manager of the Burin Import and Export Company and finally opened his own business around 1930. He was defeated when he ran for reelection in 1923. Cheeseman was appointed Chief Inspector of Fisheries and then Chief Fisheries Officer for Newfoundland. He later served in the Newfoundland Executive Council as Minister of Fisheries and Co-Operatives and then as Minister of Provincial Affairs. He retired from the assembly in 1966.

Cheeseman married Mona Ludlow; the couple had two sons. His son Roy also served in the Newfoundland assembly.

A Newfoundland provincial park, John T. Cheeseman Provincial Park, was named in his honour.

References 

Members of the Executive Council of Newfoundland and Labrador
1892 births
1968 deaths
Bishop Feild School alumni
People from the Dominion of Newfoundland